Langgade station is a station on the Frederikssund radial of the S-train network in Copenhagen, Denmark.

Cultural references
Yvonne (Kirsten Walther) turns a car around at Valby Langgade station at 1:24:28 in the 1977 Olsen-banden film The Olsen Gang Outta Sight.

See also
 List of railway stations in Denmark

References

Railway stations in Valby
S-train (Copenhagen) stations
Railway stations opened in 1941
1941 establishments in Denmark
Railway stations in Denmark opened in the 20th century